Dag Lövaas (born 25 February 1951 in Holmestrand, Norway) is a former international motorcycle speedway rider, who reached the finals of the Speedway World Championship in 1974.  His brother Ulf was also a speedway rider.

Career summary
He won the British League in 1973 with Reading Racers finishing with the 5th highest average in the league. When Reading closed for a year he moved to the Hackney Hawks in 1974, finishing the season with the highest recorded average in the Hawks' history.
He then rode for Oxford Rebels (photo) in 1975, winning the Midland Cup and then moved with the team and the promoters Danny Dunton and Robert Dugard to become the White City Rebels in 1976. Dag had been keen to ride at Oxford, a track he loved and was disappointed at the move to the London stadium in 1976. 
On deciding not to return to England in 1977, White City were granted a 'Dag Lovaas (Rider Replacement)' facility for the entire season, in which they ended up as champions.

World Final appearances

Individual World Championship
 1974 -  Göteborg, Ullevi - 11th place - 5 points

World Pairs Championship
 1973 -  Borås  (with Reidar Eide) - 5th - 17pts (8)

References

External links 
www.hackneyhawks.co.uk

1953 births
Living people
Norwegian speedway riders
Hackney Hawks riders
Newcastle Diamonds riders
Reading Racers riders
Oxford Rebels riders
White City Rebels riders
People from Holmestrand
Sportspeople from Vestfold og Telemark